Lord Scott may refer to:

 Lord Scott of Buccleuch, subsidiary title of Duke of Buccleuch
 Richard Scott, Baron Scott of Foscote, British judge
 Lord Henry William Scott-Bentinck, British Conservative Party politician